Alexander Popov (born 3 February 1942) is an Australian architect working in the Late 20th Century Modern style.

Biography
Popov was born in Shanghai of Russian parents and moved to Sydney aged twelve. He was educated at Newington College (1958-1960) and the University of New South Wales before studying  further in Denmark. Popov graduated in architecture from the Royal Danish Academy of Art in 1971 and then worked with Henning Larsen and Jørn Utzon (to whose daughter Lin he was married for 15 years). He returned to Australia in 1983 and established Alex Popov Architects Pty Ltd (later Alex Popov & Associates). The practice is now known as PopovBass with both Australian architect Brian Bass and Alex Popov as directors. The practice has been successful in a number of design competitions and has received numerous major awards from the Royal Australian Institute of Architects including several Wilkinson Awards and the Robin Boyd Award.

An original monograph on Popov's earlier works, titled Alex Popov: Buildings and Projects with text by Paul McGillick and photography by Kraig Carlstrom, was published by Axel Menges, Stuttgart. Another comprehensive monograph titled Alex Popov Architects : Selected Works 1999 - 2007 with text by Anna Johnson and photography by Patrick Bingham-Hall was published by Pesaro Publishing.

Key works
 Griffiths Teas Apartments, Surry Hills
 Griffith House, Griffith
 Balmoral House, Balmoral
 Mosman House, Mosman
 Point Piper House, Point Piper
 The Grantham, Potts Point
 Middle Cove House, Middle Cove
 Whale Beach House, Whale Beach
 Sam Miranda Winery, Oxley
 Canopy, Cammeray
 Northbridge House, Northbridge
 Castlecrag House, Castlecrag
 Thredbo, Thredbo
 Rockpool, Mona Vale
 Griffin House, Castlecrag
 SCECGS Redlands Gymnasium. Cremorne

Awards
 2014 Wilkinson Award for Residential Architecture (New) - Griffith House, Griffith
 2011 Mosman Design Awards - Mosman House 2, Mosman
 2005 RAIA Robin Boyd Award Commendation - Canopy, Cammeray
 2005 RAIA Award for Architecture Multiple Housing - Canopy, Cammeray
 2005 RAIA Commendation Single Housing - Northbridge House 
 2000 RAIA Award for Architecture Single and Multiple Housing - Rockpool, Mona Vale
 1996 RAIA Robin Boyd Award Commendation - Florida Road, Palm Beach
 1992 RAIA Sulman Merit Award - SCEGS Redlands Gymnasium, Cremorne
 1992 RAIA Architecture Australia Prize for Unbuilt Projects - Boardwalk of Sydney Opera House
 1990 Robin Boyd Award for Outstanding Architectural Project - Griffin House, Castlecrag
 1990 RAIA Wilkinson Award Residential Architecture Griffin House, Castlecrag

References

Bibliography
 The New Asia Pacific House Patrick Bingham-Hall 2010
 POPOV Alex Popov Architects Selected Works 1999-2007 Anna Johnson (photography by Patrick Bingham-Hall) 2008 
 Concrete Poetry Joe Rollo 2004 
 Alex Popov: Buildings and Projects Paul McGillick (photographs Kraig Carlstrom) 2002 
 Australian Architecture Now Davina Jackson 2002 
 Living in Sydney 2001 
 Guide to Sydney Architecture Graham Jahn 1997 
 Award Winning Australian Architecture Neville Quarry 1996 
 Australian Style Bettsy Walters 1992

External links
 PopovBass Website

1942 births
Living people
Australian people of Russian descent
New South Wales architects
20th-century Australian architects
21st-century Australian architects
Modernist architects
People educated at Newington College
Royal Danish Academy of Fine Arts alumni